Edwin Jones was a large department store in Southampton, England founded in 1860 in East Street, Southampton with further stores established in Old Christchurch Road, Bournemouth, and Clinton Arcade, Weymouth. The business became part of the Debenhams Group in 1928 and was re-branded under their name in 1973.

History
Edwin Jones and his sister, along with a 12 year old apprentice opened a small single fronted shop in 1860, before expanding to larger premises in the same street shortly after, later expanding this store by buying the neighboring Blue Boar pub.

In 1880 he bought buildings facing the park in East Street, after failing to purchase the Wesleyan Chapel, which he demolished and built into what was called the Queen's Building. Prior to this expansion, Edwin Jones had become the mayor of Southampton in 1873 and 1875, retiring as a councilor in 1890. At this point he was appointed the Deputy Lieutenant of Hampshire, a post he held until his death six years later.

The business further expanded after Edward Jones' death with the new Manchester House building, however in 1928 the business was purchased by Debenhams but continued to operate under its original name.

During World War II the store was destroyed during The Blitz, and the new store was not completed until 1959 from a design by architects Healing & Overbury. The store continued to operate under the Edwin Jones name until 1973 when Debenhams renamed the store in their name as part of their rationalization program.

In 2020, all Debenhams stores were closed during the COVID-19 pandemic and the chain went into administration, although continued to trade online. During this period it was announced that the Southampton store would remain closed permanently.

References

Southampton
Defunct department stores of the United Kingdom
Defunct retail companies of the United Kingdom
Retail companies established in 1860
1860 establishments in England
Department store buildings in the United Kingdom